The following lists events that happened during 1965 in Singapore.
 Singapore was a part of the Federation of Malaysia until 9 August 1965.

Incumbents
President: Yusof Ishak (starting 9 August)
Prime Minister: Lee Kuan Yew (starting 9 August)

Events

January
6 January – The Orchard Theatre (present-day Cathay Cineleisure Orchard) was opened.

March
10 March – Indonesian saboteurs carry out the MacDonald House bombing, killing 3 people.

May
9 May – Lee Kuan Yew begins campaigning for a Malaysian Malaysia. It began with the formation of the Malaysian Solidarity Convention.

July
10 July – A by-election was held in Hong Lim after Ong Eng Guan of the United People's Party resigned. After the vote, Lee Khoon Choy from the People's Action Party was elected into Hong Lim constituency, defeating Ong Chang Sam of the Barisan Sosialis.

August
9 August –
The Malaysian Parliament votes to expel Singapore from the Federation; Singapore becomes independent after separating from Malaysia.
On the same day, the Ministry of Foreign Affairs was established, as well as the Ministry of Interior and Defence.
TV Singapura merges with Radio Singapura to form Radio and Television Singapore (RTS).

September
21 September – Singapore is admitted into the United Nations as the 117th member.

October
15 October –
Singapore becomes the 22nd member of the Commonwealth.
The Singapore Conference Hall is officially opened.

November
27 November – Singapore's first underground carpark is officially opened in Raffles Place, with a public garden built on top.

December
8 December – The first sitting of Parliament commenced. However, MPs from Barisan Sosialis boycotted the first session.
14–21 December – Singapore took part in the 3rd South East Asian Peninsular Games. It clinched the third place, accumulating a total of 76 medals.
22 December – Constitutional Amendment Act is passed and Yusof bin Ishak becomes the first President of Singapore.
23 December – The Singapore Army Act is passed, leading to the formation of the Singapore Army.
30 December – The People's Defence Force Act was passed, leading to the formation of the People's Defence Force. This was done to build up the Singapore Army before the introduction of National Service.

Births
 12 January – Rayson Tan – Actor.
 24 March – 
Gurmit Singh – Actor.
Yee Jenn Jong – Politician.
 27 March – Eric Khoo – Filmmaker.
 28 March – Sylvia Lim – Politician.
 19 July – Maliki Osman – Politician.
 22 August – Chen Liping – Actress.
 10 October – Chen Xiuhuan – Actress.
 22 October – Ang Hin Kee – Former politician.
 Boey Kim Cheng – Poet.
 Elim Chew – Founder of 77th Street.
 Felix Cheong – Poet.
 Haresh Sharma – Resident playwright of The Necessary Stage.
 Joash Moo – Novelist, poet, illustrator.
 Yang Libing – Actress.

References

 
Years in Singapore
Singapore